O'Hurley is a surname, and may refer to:

 Dermot O'Hurley (c. 1530–1584), Irish Roman Catholic archbishop of Cashel.
 John O'Hurley (born 1954), American actor, voice actor, and television personality.
 Raymond O'Hurley (1909–1970), Canadian politician.
 Shannon O'Hurley, American actress.

See also
 Hurley (disambiguation)
 Hurley (surname)
 O'Herlihy (surname)